Pepsi Cola Lake is a lake in Florence County, South Carolina, in the United States.

The lake was likely so named on account of its dark water, according to local history.

See also
List of lakes in South Carolina

References

Lakes of South Carolina
Bodies of water of Florence County, South Carolina